John Clayton (7 April 1940 – 25 September 2003) was an Australian television and film character actor, primarily in soap operas, including  Home And Away where he played the brief role of the brother of  Pippa Fletcher, wheelchair-using former cricketer Danny King in 1988. He also had roles in theatre productions.

Television credits (selected) 
He was best known for his numerous television work, and  guest appearances on many series and soap operas with credits including: Homicide, Division 4, Matlock Police, Stacey's Gym, Rush, The Outsiders, Chopper Squad, A Country Practice, The Flying Doctors, E Street, Police Rescue, Blue Heelers, Echo Point, Water Rats, Wildside, Farscape, Grass Roots and All Saints. Heartbreak High ( 1994–1997) as Don Summers.

Film credits (selected)
His film credits included Games for Parents and Other Children (1975) High Rolling (1977), The Irishman (1978), Newsfront (1978), Palm Beach (1980), Far East (1982), Midnite Spares (1983), With Prejudice (1983), Goodbye Paradise (1983), Unfinished Business (1985), High Tide (1987), To Make a Killing (1988), Boundaries of the Heart (1988), Out of the Body (1988) and Shotgun Wedding (1993).

References

External links
 

1940 births
2003 deaths
AACTA Award winners
Australian male television actors
Deaths from cancer in New South Wales